Open Watcom Assembler or WASM is an x86 assembler produced by Watcom, based on the Watcom Assembler found in Watcom C/C++ compiler and Watcom FORTRAN 77. Further development is being done on the 32- and 64-bit JWASM project,. which more closely matches the syntax of Microsoft's assembler.

There are experimental assemblers for PowerPC, Alpha AXP, and MIPS.

Technical details

Assembler
Native support for output formats Intel OMF output formats
Supports Intel x86 (Pentium MMX, Pentium III-4, 3DNow!, SSE and SSE2) instruction sets.
Supports Microsoft macro assembler (MASM) 5 and 6 syntax (incomplete).

Disassembler
There is an associated Watcom disassembler, wdis. The assembler does not have listing facilities; instead the use of wdis for generating listings is recommended. wdis can read OMF, COFF and ELF object files and PE and ELF executables. It supports 16-bit and 32-bit x86 instruction set including MMX, 3DNow!, SSE, SSE2, and SSE3. Support for PowerPC, Alpha AXP, MIPS, and SPARC V8 instruction sets is also built in.

WASM forks

JWasm
JWasm is a fork of Wasm originated by Japheth with following features:
Native support for output formats Intel OMF (16/32-bit), MS Coff (32-bit and 64-bit), Elf (32-bit and 64-bit), Bin and DOS MZ.
Precompiled JWasm binaries are available for DOS, Windows and Linux. For OS/2 and FreeBSD, makefiles are supplied.
Supports Intel x86 (8086, 80186, 80286, 80386, 80486, Pentium, Pentium Pro), x86-64 instruction sets with SIMD (MMX, 3DNow!, SSE, SSE2, SSE3 and SSSE3, SSE4.1/2 (since Jwasm), AVX (since JWasm 2.06), VMX (Intel VT-x; AMD SVM, the latter though already implemented, currently still inactive) extensions (since JWasm 2.09)).
JWasm is written in C. The source is portable and has successfully been tested with Open Watcom, MS VC, GCC and more.
On Windows, JWasm can be used with both Win32Inc and Masm32. Since v2.01, it will also work with Sven B. Schreiber's SBS WALK32 Win32 Assembly Language Kit
C header files can be converted to include files for JWasm with Japheth's own dedicated h2incX.
JWasm's source code is released under the Sybase Open Watcom Public License, which allows free commercial and non-commercial use.
Fully supports Microsoft macro assembler 6 syntax, all MASM 8 instructions sets.
Japheth ceased development of JWASM in January 2014 with version 2.12pre, but others on the Masm32 forum picked up where Japheth left off.

HJWasm
HJWasm, adding the prefix H in reference to Masm32 forum member Habran who started off this second WASM development continuation. Version 2.13pre was originally announced in 2016. New features include:
Instructions:
SIMD:
MMX: MOVQ and added in 2.13, to supplement MOVD. 
AVX2: VGATHERDPD, VGATHERQPD, VGATHERDPS, VGATHERQPS, VPGATHERDD, VPGATHERQD, VPGATHERDQ, VPGATHERQQ, VEX-encoded general purpose instructions added in 2.13. Remaining instructions added in 2.16.
AVX-512: VCMPxxPD, VCMPxxPS, VCMPxxSD, VCMPxxPD, VCMPxxSS, AVX-512F set, EVEX-encoded instructions added in 2.13; VMOVQ added 2.13, to supplement MOVD. Remaining instructions added in 2.16.
Random Number Generator: RDRAND, RDSEED added in 2.13.
half-precision conversions: F16C(VCVTPH2PS, VCVTPS2PH) added in 2.13.
Intel MPX: Added in 2.31.
Registers: RIP, ZMM registers added in 2.13.
OO language extension added in 2.25.

HASM
HASM is a renamed version of HJWASM, starting in version 2.33. The name was used following a MASM Forum discussion thread that originally proposed a replacement name. The name HASM was proposed by forum member habran in Reply #6, and was finalized at the end of discussion thread at Reply #33. No known features are added in HASM's release cycle.

UASM
The name was actually used in version 2.33 (dated 2017-05-20) at Terraspace ltd's product page, but it was only announced in version 2.34. Changes to HJWASM includes:
Instruction sets: RDPID added in 2.38.
AVX-512: VAESDEC added in 2.38
Data transfer: MOVBE added in 2.47. MOVABS added in 2.48.
Intel ADX: ADCX, ADOX added in 2.38
Intel MPX: Support of BND prefix added in 2.34. BND prefix removed from JCXZ instruction group in 2.40.
CLMUL instruction set: Added in 2.46.8, including pseudo-op forms of CLMUL.
Hashing: SHA instruction set added in 2.46.8.
Supervisor Mode Access Prevention: CLAC added in 2.38.
Persistent Memory Extensions: CLFLUSHOPT added in 2.38.
Addressing modes: 64bit absolute immediate (2.37)
Identified types
Record types: fully supports registers and up to 32bit record fields in 2.41.
Support for 128bit: Added in 2.42, inline declaration with the type added in 2.43.1 / .2.
Support of typedef chain on return types added in 2.46.8.
m512 built-in types added in 2.47.
Console colour coding: Added for Windows, OSX and Linux in 2.43.1 / .2.
Function calling: C-style function calling added in 2.46.

References

External links
wasm assembler wiki
JWasm
Terraspace ltd pages: HJWASM, Hasm, UASM

Open Watcom Assembler (WASM)